Davy Spillane (born 1959 in Dublin, Ireland) is an Irish musician, songwriter and a player of uilleann pipes and low whistle.

Biography

Irish music 
At the age of 12, Spillane started playing the uilleann pipes. His father encouraged him and inspired him with his love of all music genres. For the next three years he played at sessions and met many prominent Irish musicians. At the age of 16, he played in Ireland, the United Kingdom and Europe. In 1978, he began to write his own music. He starred as a gypsy in Joe Comerford's 1981 film Traveller.

Moving Hearts and solo albums 
He was a founder member of Moving Hearts, along with Christy Moore and Donal Lunny in 1981. Although each member had a strong pedigree of Irish folk music, the band played mostly original compositions, sometimes with a political edge and a folk-rock sound. Their final album The Storm (1985) was purely instrumental and had several slower pieces written by Spillane. He then made the surprise move of joining up with American musician Béla Fleck, the Englishman Albert Lee and others to record a Davy Spillane debut album of his new compositions and bluegrass and original blues, Atlantic Bridge. There was a promotional touring band which also recorded Out of the Air in 1988, essentially a live version of Atlantic Bridge. Spillane then gathered together a new set of musicians, including Rory Gallagher and Kevin Glackin to record Shadow Hunter, an album of various rock and folk styles. This was followed by Pipedreams in 1991.

Collaborations
Spillane played as special guest soloist in orchestral work in 1992 called "The Seville Suite", describing events in 1601 in Irish-Spanish history. Bill Whelan then worked for Spillane and Andy Irvine on the album, EastWind. In 1993, Spillane collaborated with Canadian musicians such as Bryan Adams, and Daniel Weaver on his album Weeds plus Celine Dion's My Heart Will go On. In 1994, Spillane was a special guest soloist in Riverdance. Spillane also collaborated with Rory Gallagher on the tracks "The Road to Ballyalla", "Litton Lane" and "One For Phil" as well as with Enya on her 1988 Watermark tracks "Exile" and "Na Laetha Geal M'Óige".

Film music 
In 1992, Spillane composed music for Peter Kosminsky's film Emily Brontë's Wuthering Heights and, in 1995, reached a larger audience with the film Rob Roy. Other compositions and guesting includes Kate Bush's Sensual World (1989), Mike Oldfield's Voyager (1996), Bryan Adams' MTV Unplugged, Van Morrison and Elvis Costello. Other films include Eat the Peach and The Disappearance of Finbar. Paul Winter's album Journey with the Sun (2002). Spillane earned a Grammy Award and also nominated for second one.

Spillane served his apprenticeship with pipe-makers Dan Dowd and Johnny Burke and now makes all his own instruments. In 2000, he recorded his only album of traditional tunes with Kevin Glackin, entitled Forgotten Days.

Discography

Moving Hearts
Moving Hearts (1981)
Dark End of the Street (1982)
The Storm (1985)
Live Hearts (1986) (recorded 1983)
Live in Dublin (2008)

Solo albums 
 Atlantic Bridge (1987)
 Out of the Air (1988)
 Shadow Hunter (1990)
 Pipedreams (1991)
 A Place Among The Stones (1994)
 The Sea of Dreams (1998)
 Deep Blue Sea (2004)
 Between Longing & Belonging (2016)

Collaborations 
 EastWind (1992) – with Andy Irvine
 Calman The Dove (1998) – with Savourna Stevenson
 Forgotten Days (2001) – with Kevin Glackin

Contributions 
 The Piper's Rock - A Compilation of Young Pipers, Various Artists (?) - Uilleann pipes
 The Heritage Tapes: Songs and Stories from Old Tiger Bay, Various Artists (?)
 Irish Festival, Various Artists (1980) - Uilleann pipes on The Old Bush/Rakish Paddy
 My Very Favourite Nursery Rhyme Record, Tim Hart (1981) - Uilleann pipes
 The Drunken Sailor and other Kids Favorites, Tim Hart (1983) - Uilleann pipes
 Inarticulate Speech of the Heart, Van Morrison (1983) - Uilleann pipes & Low Whistle
 Getting to the Border, Alistair Russell (1984) - Uilleann pipes & Low Whistle
 Now and Then, The Sands Family (1986) - Low Whistle on When the Music Starts to Play
 Classic Irish Ballads, Diarmuid O'Leary & The Bards (1986) - Uilleann pipes & Low Whistle 
 Dancing with Strangers, Chris Rea (1987) - Uilleann pipes, Low Whistle & Guitar
 Under the Influence, Mary Coughlan (1987) - Uilleann pipes
 Goreuon, Best of (Featuring Donal Lunny/Davy Spillane), Jim O'Rourke, Uilleann pipes & Low Whistle 
 Watermark, Enya (1988) - Uilleann pipes & Low Whistle
 North and South, Gerry Rafferty (1988) - Uilleann pipes & Low Whistle
 Dublin Millenium Song (Single), Various Artists (1988) - Uilleann pipes
 We've Come A Long Way, Liam Clancy/Tommy Makem (1989) - Uilleann pipes & Low Whistle
 The Sensual World, Kate Bush (1989) - Uilleann pipes & Low Whistle
 All I Remember, Mick Hanly (1989) - Uilleann pipes & Low Whistle
 Ogam, Ogam (1989) - Fearless composed by Davy Spillane
 Winds of Change, Oisin - Geraldine MacGowan & Anne Conroy (1989) - Uilleann pipes & Low Whistle
 Spike, Elvis Costello (1989) - Uilleann pipes & Low Whistle
 Elio samaga hukapan kariyana turu, Elio E Le Storie Tese (1989) - Uilleann pipes
 Brand New Dance, Emmylou Harris (1990) - Uilleann pipes
 This Rhythm, T. T. Oksala (1990) - Uilleann pipes
 Hopes and Bodies, The Senators (1990) - Uilleann pipes 
 The Sweet Keeper, Tanita Tikaram (1990) - Low Whistle on It All Came Back Today
 Sojourner's Song, Buddy Greene (1990) - Uilleann pipes & Low Whistle
 Vigil in a Wilderness of Mirrors, Fish (1990) - Uilleann pipes & Low Whistle on Vigil
 Put 'Em Under Pressure (single), Republic of Ireland Football Squad (1990)
 Two Rooms: Celebrating the Songs of Elton John & Bernie Taupin (1991) - Uilleann pipes on Kate Bush, Rocket Man
 Mighty Like a Rose, Elvis Costello (1991) - Uilleann pipes
 Mission Street, Kieran Halpin (1991) - Uilleann pipes & Low Whistle
 Rude Awakening, Andy Irvine (1991)
 Smoke and Strong Whiskey, Christy Moore (1991) - Low Whistle
 The Ways of the World, Mary Custy & Eoin O'Neill (1991) - Uilleann pipes
 Lam Toro, Baaba Maal (1992) - Uilleann pipes
 High on the Happy Side, Wet Wet Wet (1992) - Low Whistle on Put The Light On
 Soul Inspiration, Simon Climie (1992) - Low Whistle
 Rita Connolly, Rita Connolly (1992) - Low Whistle
 Something Special In The Air (Single) for Impact 92, Derry City Council (1992) - Uilleann pipes & Low Whistle 
 Sentimental Killer, Mary Coughlan (1992) - Uilleann pipes
 Endless Emotion, Johnny Logan (1992) - Uilleann pipes
 Harmony, Londonbeat (1992) - Low Whistle on Harmony and The Sea of Tranquility
 Bajo El Signo de Cain, Miguel Bose (1993) -  Uilleann pipes & Low Whistle
 Again, Alan Stivell (1993) - Uilleann pipes
 Before & After, Tim Finn (1993) - Uilleann pipes on Many's The Time
 Solid Ground, Dolores Keane (1993) - Uilleann pipes
 Espresso Logic, Chris Rea (1993) - Uilleann pipes
 Far from Home, Traffic (1994) - Uilleann pipes on Holy Ground
 Traditional Music In Support Of Doolin Coast And Cliff Rescue Service, Various Artists (1994) - Uilleann pipes
 33 Revolutions Per Minute, Marxman (1994) - Whistles
 Daniel Weaver, Daniel Weaver (1994) - Uilleann pipes & Low Whistle
 Cumplicidodes, Luis Represas (1994) - Uilleann pipes & Low Whistle
 The Sound of Stone - Artists for Mullaghmore, Various Artists (1994) - Low Whistle
 Celtic Themes, Various Artists (1994) - Uilleann pipes
  A River Of Sound: The Changing Course Of Irish Music, BBC/RTE programme (1995) - Uilleann pipes & Low Whistle
 Seville Suite, Bill Whelan (1995) - Uilleann pipes & Low Whistle
 Folk Music Ensemble, Dan Foyle (1995) - Uilleann pipes & Low Whistle
 Cry of a Dreamer, Sean Tyrell (1995) - Uilleann pipes & Low Whistle
 Little Bruises, Gary Kemp (1995) - Uilleann pipes & Low Whistle
 Misty Eyed Adventures, Moya Brennan (1995) - Low Whistle see above
 Transatlantic Sessions - Series 1, Various Artists (1995) - Uilleann pipes & Low Whistle
 Arabesque, Mike Batt (1995) - Uilleann pipes & Low Whistle
 Riverdance: Music from the Show, Bill Whelan (1995) - Uilleann pipes & Low Whistle
 Songs From A Secret Garden, Secret Garden (1996) - Uilleann pipes & Low Whistle
 Volume 1: Sound Magic, Afro Celt Sound System (1996) - Uilleann pipes & Low Whistle
 Voyager, Mike Oldfield (1996) - Uilleann pipes & Low Whistle
 Hammer, Zoe (1996) -Uilleann pipes on The Lion Roars
 Ao Vivo No CCB, Luis Represas (1996) - Uilleann pipes & Low Whistle
 Common Ground, Various Artists (1996) - Low Whistle on Whistling Low/Errigal, Mary of the South Seas & On Raglan Road
 White Stones, Secret Garden (1997) - Uilleann pipes
 Kilim, Nikola Parov (1997) - Uilleann pipes
 What Did He Say?, Victor Wooten (1997) - Uilleann pipes
 Illumination, Richard Souther, Hildegard von Bingen (1997) - Uilleann pipes & Low Whistle
 Gospel Oak, Sinead O'Connor (1997) - Low & High Whistle
 Amara, Island Currents, Joe Boske (1997) - Low Whistle on The Delphi Air
 Laberinto Volume 2, Miguel Bose (1997) - Uilleann pipes & Low Whistle
 Ar Galon Digorr (single), Annie Ebrel (1997) on Fest Vraz Musique Bretonnes - Uilleann pipes & Low Whistle 
 Unplugged, Bryan Adams (1997) - Uilleann pipes & Low Whistle
 Sun and the Moon and the Stars, Spirit of Eden (1998) - Uilleann pipes
 The Peace Within, BMC Band (1998) - Uilleann pipes & Low Whistle
 Wandering Home, David Lynch (1998) - Uilleann pipes & Low Whistle
 Piece of Cake, Lubos Malina (1999) - Uilleann pipes & Low Whistle
 Celtic Solstice, Paul Winter (1999) - Uilleann pipes & Low Whistle
 New Freedom Bell, Druka Trava (1999) - Low Whistle
 The Orchard, Sean Tyrell (1999) - Uilleann pipes & Low Whistle (Album recorded at Burrenstone Studios)
 Streams, Various Artists (1999) - Uilleann pipes & Low Whistle
 Live at Slane Castle (DVD), Bryan Adams (2000) - Low Whistle
 Journey with the Sun, Paul Winter (2000) - Uilleann pipes & Low Whistle
 Irvi, Denez Prigent (2000) - Uilleann pipes
 Behind the Mist: Music from Conamaras' Bog and Sea Weeks (2000) - Uilleann pipes & Low Whistle
 Dreamcatcher, Secret Garden (2001) - Uilleann pipes & Low Whistle
 Adiemus Vol 4, Karl Jenkins (2001) - Uilleann pipes on The Eternal Knot
 Girls Won't Leave the Boys Alone, Cherish the Ladies (2001) - Uilleann pipes
 The Best Of Mary Black 1991-2001, Mary Black (2001) - Uilleann pipes
 Unearthed, Posthumus (2001) - Uilleann pipes & Low Whistle
 12 Vox - The Way To be Ourselves, Taro Iwashiro (2001) - Uilleann pipes & Low Whistle
 Ceol Tacsi, Various Artists (2003) - Uilleann pipes & Low Whistle on Muladach Is Mi Air M'aineol with Karen Matheson
 Spiorad, The Lismorahaun Singers (2003) - Uilleann pipes
 The River Returning, Johnny Duhan (2003) - Uilleann pipes & Low Whistle
 Sexual Healing (single B-side), Kate Bush (2005) - Uilleann pipes
 Grief Never Grows Old - (single), One World Project (2005) - Uilleann pipes & Low Whistle
 Silver Solstice, Paul Winter Consort & Friends (2005) - Uilleann pipes
 Human Child/Mannabarn - Eivor (2007) - Uilleann pipes & Low Whistle
 To The Moon, Capercaillie (2008) Tracks from Rob Roy - Uilleann pipes & Low Whistle
 Art of Chill 5, Bent (2008) - Uilleann pipes on Pipegroove
 Distant Shore, Orla Fallon (2009) - Low Whistle
 This Is What I Live For, Richard Anthony Jay (2009) - Uilleann pipes & Low Whistle on Gone But Not Forgotten
 A Different Hat, Paul Carrack (2010) - Uilleann pipes & Low Whistle
 Dream of You, Sharon Corr (2010) - Low Whistle on Cooley's Reel
 Director's Cut, Kate Bush (2011) - Uilleann pipes & Low Whistle on Flower of the Mountain
 Lament, Various Artists (2012) - Low Whistle on Lament For the Dead of the North
 The Peacemakers, Karl Jenkins (2012) - Uilleann pipes
 Transparent Music 2, B. J. Cole (2012) - Low Whistle
 Papitwo, Miguel Bose (2012) -  Uilleann pipes & Low Whistle
 Goodbye (single), Mary Jane Riemann (2013) - Uilleann pipes
 Man on the Rocks, Mike Oldfield (2014) - Low Whistle on Moonshine 
 Whisky Lullabies/Suantraí Meisciúil - (single), Janet Devlin (2015) - Low Whistle on Suantraí Meisciúil 
 Drowning (single), Simone Kaye (date unknown) - Uilleann pipes & Low Whistle
 Creation, Johnny Duhan (2016) - Low Whistle on The Three Temptations.
 Source, Afro Celt Sound System (2016) - Uilleann pipes & Low Whistle
 The Ashgrove Sessions, Ashgrove (2016) - Uilleann pipes & Low Whistle

Soundtracks 
 Lamb (1985)
 Eat the Peach (1986)
 Reefer and the Model (1988)
 The Ballad of the Sad Café (1991) – Low Whistle
 Wuthering Heights (1992)
 Rob Roy (1995) – Uilleann pipes & Low Whistle
 Michael Collins (1996) – Uilleann pipes & Low Whistle
 The Disappearance of Finbar (1996)
 Xenogears (with Yasunori Mitsuda) (1998) – Low Whistle
 Creid (with Yasunori Mitsuda) (1998) – Uilleann pipes & Low Whistle
 Dancing at Lughnasa (1998) – Uilleann pipes & Low Whistle
 Excalibur, La légende des Celtes, Various Artists (1999)
 Aoi ~ Tokugawa Sandai, Taro Iwashiro (2000) - Uilleann pipes & Low Whistle
 Xenosaga (2002) – Uilleann pipes & Low Whistle
 Gangs of New York (2002) - Uilleann pipes & Low Whistle
 Graal, Catherine Lara (2005) - Uilleann pipes & Low Whistle

Notes

References

External links
 Official website
 

1959 births
Living people
Irish tin whistle players
Irish uilleann pipers
Musicians from County Dublin
Moving Hearts members
Afro Celt Sound System members
People educated at Coláiste Eoin